The Messerschmitt P.1092 was a series of Messerschmitt experimental aircraft for the Luftwaffe during the Second World War. Several designs for single- and twin-engined aircraft were drafted under the same designation. 

The different aircraft were all-metal monoplanes with retractable tricycle landing gear, swept wings, and a jet engine. A number of variants were drawn. The P.1092 remained a project, with no aircraft built.

Variants
 Messerschmitt P.1092A
 Messerschmitt P.1092B-1
 Messerschmitt P.1092B-2
 Messerschmitt P.1092A-B
 Messerschmitt P.1092/2
 Messerschmitt P.1092/3
 Messerschmitt P.1092/4
 Messerschmitt P.1092/5

Specifications (Messerschmitt P.1092 A)

Notes

References

Nowarra, Heinz J.. Die Deutsche Luftruestung 1933-1945 - Vol.3 - Flugzeugtypen Henschel-Messerschmitt. Bernard & Graefe Verlag. 1993. Koblenz.  (Gesamtwek),  (Band 3)

P.1092